Rory Harper (born 1950) is an American science fiction writer and community activist living in College Station, Texas.

Life and career 
He was born in Beaumont, Texas, and attended the University of Houston but did not graduate. He was one of the founders of Houston's Inlet Drug Crisis Center, where he worked with harm reduction pioneer David F. Duncan.

He has published science fiction and horror short stories in many science fiction magazines, some of which have been anthologized. His one novel, Petrogypsies was published by Baen Books in 1989 and has since become a cult novel in and around the Texas oilfields. DarkStar Books released a new, partially illustrated trade paperback edition of Petrogypsies in December 2009, and plans to continue the series with two more volumes (Sprocket Goes International, Sprocket Goes Interstellar) in 2010 and 2011.

Harper is one of a group of regular contributors to the Eat Our Brains blog.

Bibliography

Novels 
 Petrogypsies] (Baen Books in 1989; DarkStar Books 2009)

Short fiction 
 Psycho-Stars (Asimov's, Mar 1980)
 M-M-Magic (Fantasy Book, Dec 1981)
 Duty to the Empire (Amazing Stories, Sep 1983)
 Petrogypsies (Far Frontiers, Volume II, Apr 1985)
 Regeneration (Aboriginal SF, Dec 1986)
 Snorkeling in The River Lethe (Amazing Stories, Jan 1987)
 Triage (The Magazine of Fantasy & Science Fiction, Feb 1988)
 Monsters, Tearing off My Face (Asimov's, May 1989; The Year's Best Fantasy and Horror: Third Annual Collection, 1990)
 God's Bullets (Aboriginal SF, Nov 1990)
 Do Me Good (Pulphouse, Sep 1993)
 Leonardo's Hands, with Steven Gould (RevolutionSF, Aug 2005) ( available online)
 Therapeutic Intervention (The Living Dead 2, ed. John Joseph Adams, 2010)

References

External links 
 Eat Our Brains group blog
 

1950 births
Living people
20th-century American novelists
American male novelists
American science fiction writers
People from Beaumont, Texas
University of Houston alumni
American male short story writers
20th-century American short story writers
20th-century American male writers